William Combe (fl. 1382–1401) was an English politician.

He was a Member (MP) of the Parliament of England for Chichester in October 1382, April 1384 and 1401.

He was Mayor of Chichester 1390–1391.

References

14th-century births
15th-century deaths
English MPs October 1382
English MPs April 1384
English MPs 1401
14th-century English politicians
15th-century English politicians
People from Chichester
Mayors of Chichester